Thomas Attwood Walmisley (21 January 181417 January 1856) was an English composer and organist.

Life and career
He was born in London, the son of Thomas Forbes Gerrard Walmisley (1783–1866), a well-known organist and composer of church music and glees. Thomas Attwood was his godfather, and the boy was educated in music under their tuition.

Walmisley was organist of Croydon Parish Church in 1830 before becoming organist at Trinity College, Cambridge in 1833, and there he soon became prominent by his anthems and other compositions. He was simultaneously organist for the Choir of St John's College, Cambridge. He not only took the degrees of Mus.Bac. and Mus.Doc. but also graduated at Jesus College as BA and MA.

In 1836, Walmisley was made Professor of Music at Cambridge. His Cathedral Music was edited after his death by his father.

Walmisley died in 1856 and is buried in the churchyard of St Andrew's Church, Fairlight, East Sussex.

Compositions
Walmisley is remembered chiefly for his Magnificat and Nunc dimittis in D minor, which have a place in the Anglican choral repertoire. He also composed numerous Anglican chants still in general use.

Notes

References

External links

1814 births
1856 deaths
English composers
English classical organists
British male organists
Musicians from London
Alumni of Jesus College, Cambridge
Members of the University of Cambridge Faculty of Music
19th-century British composers
19th-century English musicians
19th-century British male musicians
Professors of Music (Cambridge)
Male classical organists
19th-century organists
19th-century musicologists